Black Soul Choir may refer to:

The Black Soul Choir, album Cardinal on Init Records 
"Black Soul Choir", song by 16 Horsepower from Sackcloth 'n' Ashes, covered by DevilDriver Beast (DevilDriver album)
Black Soul Choir (album), Wolves Like Us 2014